María Romero Meneses, FMA (13 January 1902 – 7 July 1977) was a Nicaraguan Catholic religious sister and a professed member from the Salesian Sisters of Don Bosco dubbed the "Social Apostle of Costa Rica".

The beatification process started on September 20th,1988 and she was titled as a Servant of God before being named Venerable on December 18th, 2000. Pope John Paul II beatified her on April 14th, 2002.

Life

María Romero Meneses was born in Nicaragua in 1902 as one of eight children to middle-class parents – her father was a government minister. Her parents were Félix Romero Arana and Ana Meneses Blandón. Her baptism was held on January the 20th. She received her Confirmation on July 23rd, 1904 from Siméon Pereira y Castellón and received her First Communion on December 8, 1909.

Romero was found to have a talent for art and music and so her parents saw to it that she was trained on the piano and the violin. She later attended the Salesians Sisters of Don Bosco's school, although in 1914 she was stricken with a long bout of rheumatic fever which she suffered until 1915 and it left her heart damaged for the remainder of her life. When she recovered it was deemed to be miraculous in nature and this led to a total confidence in the Madonna and to the vision of her vocation to the order.

The hopeful girl joined the Marian association Daughters of Mary Help of Christians on December 8, 1915, to follow her Marian call. In 1920 she joined that congregation and left for El Salvador for her period of novitiate, receiving the habit of the order on January 16, 1921. Her spiritual director was Father Emilio Bottari who gave her a prophetic recommendation: "Even though difficult moments will come and you will feel torn to pieces, be faithful and strong in your vocation". These words sustained her for the rest of her religious life. On 6 January 1929 in Nicaragua she made her final profession. Her writings indicate that she attempted to live the religious interior life after the example of John Bosco.

In 1931 she went to San José in Costa Rica which became her second homeland and at 1933 was a teacher of music and art as well as typing in a school for the daughters of rich families. A great number of her students were won over to her mode of life and worked with her to help the poor and the abandoned. Her focus was on social development while helping the rich to see if the latter could help the poor with their wealth. She set up recreational centers in 1945 as well as food distribution centers in 1953. She also set up a school for poor girls in 1961 and a clinic in 1966 for ill people. In 1973 she organized the construction of seven homes which became the foundation of the village of Centro San José – a place where poor families could have decent homes.

Romero died of a heart attack in mid-1977 in the Salesian Sisters house in León where she had been sent for a rest. Her mortal remains were sent back to San José in Costa Rica to be buried in the chapel at a Salesian house.

Beatification
The beatification process started on 20 September 1988 once the Congregation for the Causes of Saints issued the nihil obstat to the cause and titled her as a Servant of God, which allowed for the diocesan process to span from 18 November 1988 until its closure on 6 May 1992; the C.C.S. validated the process on 8 January 1993 and then received the Positio in 1997 for inspection.

Theologians approved the cause on 7 March 2000 and the C.C.S. did so as well on 3 October 2000. She was named as Venerable on 18 December 2000 after Pope John Paul II approved that she had lived a life of heroic virtue. The process for investigating a miracle spanned from 1997 until 1998 and was validated on 9 October 1998 which allowed for a medical board to approve it on 30 March 2000 and theologians to do so as well on 30 January 2001; the C.C.S. issued their approval on 3 April 2001 which led to the pope granting final approval on 24 April 2001. John Paul II beatified Romero on 14 April 2002 in Saint Peter's Square. Romero was the first individual from Central America to be beatified.

The current postulator for this cause is the Rev. Pierluigi Cameroni.

References

External links
Hagiography Circle
Saints SQPN

1902 births
1977 deaths
20th-century venerated Christians
20th-century Nicaraguan people
Beatifications by Pope John Paul II
Nicaraguan beatified people
Nicaraguan Roman Catholics
Nicaraguan emigrants to Costa Rica
People from Granada, Nicaragua
Sisters of Don Bosco
Venerated Catholics by Pope John Paul II